This is a list of notable Old Aitchisonians (pupils) who studied and graduated from the Aitchison College in Lahore, Pakistan.

A

 Safdar Ali Abbasi
 Yahya Afridi
 Iqbal Z. Ahmed
 Aitzaz Ahsan
 Munib Akhtar
 Saleem Ali
 Syed Babar Ali
 Miangul Adnan Aurangzeb
 Hammad Azhar
 Asadullah Jan

B

 Umar Ata Bandial
 Khusro Bakhtiar 
 Hashim Jawan Bakht 
 Sardar Wahid Bakhsh Bhayo
 Harcharan Singh Brar
 Akbar Bugti
 Talal Akbar Bugti
 Aameen Taqi Butt

G

 Hamid Raza Gilani

H

 Faisal Saleh Hayat
 Mian Muhammad Afzal Hayat
 Ameer Haider Khan Hoti
 Wajahat Hussain

I

 Syed Fakhar Imam
 Waleed Iqbal

J

 Sayed Muhammad Jaffar
 Jan Mohammad Jamali
 Mir Khan Muhammad Jamali
 Rustam Jamali
 Zafarullah Khan Jamali

K

 Abdus Salim Khan 
 Aimal Wali Khan
 Amin ud-din Ahmad Khan
 Amir Mohammad Khan
 Asfandyar Wali Khan
 Bazid Khan
 Ghulam Qadir Khan
 Imran Khan
 Khalid Amir Khan
 Khurshid Ali Khan
 Majid Khan (cricketer, born 1946)
 Sir Malik Umar Hayat Khan
 Nisar Ali Khan
 Omar Ayub Khan
 Nawab Sir Sadeq Mohammad Khan V
 Shaukat Hayat Khan
 Yawar Hayat Khan
 Ghulam Mustafa Khar
 Ali Kuli Khan Khattak
 Nasrullah Khan Khattak
 Pervez Khattak
 Zulfiqar Ali Khosa
 Dost Muhammad Khosa
 Muhammad Saif-ud-Din Khosa
 Sardar Muhammad Mohiuddin Khosa

L

 Awais Leghari
 Farooq Leghari
 Jaffar Khan Leghari
 Jamal Leghari
 Muhammad Mohsin Khan Leghari
 Mushtaq Leghari
 Sardar Muhammad Khan Laghari

M

 Zulfikar Ali Magsi
 Sir Sundar Singh Majithia
 Babar W. Malik
 Ahmad Raza Maneka
 Changez Marri
 Khair Bakhsh Marri
 Balakh Sher Mazari 
 Sherbaz Khan Mazari
 Ataullah Mengal
 Shahzada Alam Monnoo

N

 Amjad Ali Noon
 Sir Feroz Khan Noon

P

 Iftikhar Ali Khan Pataudi
 Sher Ali Khan Pataudi

Q

 Sadiq Hussain Qureshi
 Shah Mehmood Qureshi

R

 Rameez Raja
 Shahryar Rashed
 Wahab Riaz

S

 Sardar Ayaz Sadiq
 Umar Saif
 Yousuf Salahuddin
 Hassan Sardar
 Narindar Saroop 
 Syed Mansoor Ali Shah
 Shaan Shahid
 Ahmed Omar Saeed Sheikh
 Gurbakshish Singh
 Raja Bhalindra Singh
 Maharaja Sir Bhupinder Singh
 Maharaja Sir Yadavinder Singh

T

 Abdul Majid Khan Tarin
 Sir Malik Khizar Hayat Tiwana

Z

References

Aitchisonians